El Chapo 3: The Great Escape is a mixtape by American rapper Tony Yayo. The mixtape features exclusive tracks from Yayo with guest appearances from G-Unit affiliate Bolly.

Track listing

References

2015 mixtape albums
Albums free for download by copyright owner
Tony Yayo albums